Phoenix has been a popular name for newspapers and other periodicals. Following is a list of publications of these types that have borne the name.

Periodicals 
 Phoenix (classics journal), founded in 1946 as the first journal of classics in Canada
 Phoenix (literary magazine), a samizdat literary journal published between 1960 and 1966
 Phoenix, a city magazine published in Phoenix, Arizona
 Phoenix a student-run literary magazine at the University of Tennessee
 Phoenix a student-run literary magazine at Valencia College
 The Phoenix (magazine), an Irish news and satire magazine published since 1983
 The Phoenix (pacifist journal), published from 1936 to 1940 at an artist's commune in Woodstock, New York
 The Phoenix, a student-run literary magazine at Baylor University
 The Phoenix, a student-run literary magazine at Augusta University
 The Phoenix, a boardgaming and wargaming magazine published in the 1970s and 1980s by Simulations Publications, Inc.

Newspapers 
 Bristol Phoenix, a Bristol, Rhode Island newspaper, published by East Bay Newspapers
 The Phoenix (newspaper), an American chain of alternative weekly city newspapers
 Loyola Phoenix, a Loyola University (United States) publication
 Muskogee Phoenix, an Oklahoma, USA publication
 The Phoenix, a Swarthmore College (United States) publication
 The Phoenix, a University of British Columbia Okanagan Campus (Canada) publication

See also
 Phoenix (disambiguation)

Lists of newspapers